Euploea goudotii is a butterfly in the family Nymphalidae. It is found on La Reunion.

References

Seitz, A. Die Gross-Schmetterlinge der Erde 13: Die Afrikanischen Tagfalter. Plate XIII 23 b

Butterflies described in 1833
Euploea